This page details rugby league international match results in 2011.

* Double header played at Wembley Stadium

See also
 International rugby league in 2010

2011 in rugby league
Rugby league-related lists